Numbers is the ninth studio album, and the first concept album by singer/songwriter Cat Stevens released in November 1975.

History of the album
The album Numbers, subtitled "A Pythagorean Theory Tale," was based on a fictional planet in a far-off galaxy named Polygor. The album included a booklet with excerpts from a planned book of the same name written by Chris Bryant and Allan Scott. The booklet features pen-and-ink illustrations drawn by Stevens.

The concept of the album is a fantastic spiritual musical which is set on the planet Polygor. In the story there is a castle with a number machine. This machine exists to fulfill the sole purpose of the planet – to disperse numbers to the rest of the universe: 1, 2, 3, 4, 5, 6, 7, 8, and 9 (but notably not 0). The nine inhabitants of Polygor, the Polygons, are Monad, Dupey, Trezlar, Cubis, Qizlo, Hexidor, Septo, Octav, and Novim. As the first lines of the book say, they "followed a life of routine that had existed for as long as any could remember. ... It was, therefore, all the more shocking when on an ordinary day things first started to go wrong."  The change takes the form of Jzero, who comes from nowhere as a slave and eventually confuses everybody with his simple truth.

Release
Upon its initial release in late 1975 both fans and critics were confused by the concept and the lack of the sort of "catchy" music that they had been used to from Stevens, and although the album eventually achieved gold status, it sold far less than his previous four albums and was considered a critical failure. At one point A&M Records (his American record label) contemplated terminating his contract, but he still had two albums left to make for them. Stevens continued to be bitter about the process of fame and the pressures to make money for his label, and distanced himself from participating in promotion for the album.

Confronted with an ultimatum from the label along the lines of "make a pop record or else," he set out to make one of the more expensive records of his career, 1977's Izitso, which yielded several hits. The success of Izitso showed the label that he was still hit-worthy, but Stevens was now in process of embracing the faith of Islam, and after supplying the album Back to Earth, he opted out of the music business altogether, changed his name to Yusuf Islam, and devoted himself to the Islamic faith, education, and humanitarian work. But he would officially return to pop music with the release of An Other Cup in 2006.

In 1994, Numbers was released as a limited edition along with the albums Izitso and Back to Earth in a box set called Three from the Mobile Fidelity Sound Lab label. This box is no longer available and is thus highly prized among collectors.

Track listing
All the tracks were written by Cat Stevens.  The original LP broke with tradition and called the second side "Side 0", a reference to Jzero.

Side 1 
"Whistlestar" – 3:46
"Novim's Nightmare" – 3:50
"Majik of Majiks" – 4:30
"Drywood" – 4:53

Side 0 (2)
"Banapple Gas" – 3:07
"Land o' Freelove & Goodbye" – 2:50
"Jzero" – 3:44
"Home" – 4:09
"Monad's Anthem" – 2:43

Personnel
Cat Stevens – acoustic guitar, electric guitar, twelve string guitar, piano, Fender Rhodes electric piano, ARP 2600, ARP 2500, vocals
Jean Roussel – piano, Yamaha organ, Wurlitzer electric piano, synthesizer, harpsichord, Hammond organ, string synthesizer, vocals, vibraphone
Alun Davies – acoustic guitar, 12-string acoustic guitar, vocals
Gerry Conway – drums, vocals
Bruce Lynch – bass, double bass

Additional personnel
Simon Nicol – acoustic guitar, electric guitar, 12-string electric guitar
 – congas, wind chimes, ganza, triangle, waterphone
Gordie Fleming – accordion
David Sanborn – alto saxophone
Magic Children of Ottawa – vocals
Barbara Massey – vocals
Carl Hall – vocals
Tasha Thomas – vocals
Art Garfunkel – vocals
Lewis Furey – vocals
Melba Joyce – vocals
Carmen Twillie – vocals
Brenda Russell – vocals
Vennette Gloud – vocals
Suzanne Lynch – vocals
Anna Peacock – vocals
Vincent Beck – vocals

Certifications and sales

References 

1975 albums
Cat Stevens albums
A&M Records albums
Island Records albums
Albums recorded at Le Studio